Saint-Loyer-des-Champs is a former commune in the Orne department in north-western France. In 2015 it became part of Boischampré.

See also
Communes of the Orne department

References

Saintloyerdeschamps